Ilhom Tuychievich Nematov is an Uzbek diplomat and is the current Ambassador of Uzbekistan to the United States, presenting his credentials to US President Barack H. Obama on 27 February 2009.

References

External links
  Biography of Ilhom Nematov (Archived at WebCite)

Living people
Ambassadors of Uzbekistan to Russia
1952 births
Diplomatic Academy of the Ministry of Foreign Affairs of the Russian Federation alumni